Sangoñéu is one of 44 parishes (administrative divisions) in Tineo, a municipality within the province and autonomous community of Asturias, in northern Spain.

Villages and hamlets
 Colinas de Baxu
 L'Espín
 Horria
 Preda
 Sangoñéu

References

Parishes in Tineo